Ifechukwu Greg Chrian Eze, known by the stage name Ifex G, is a Nigerian rapper, singer and songwriter - who hails from Mbosi, in Ihiala LGA of Anambra State. He is responsible for the Hit Song "Ọfọ" featuring Phyno.

Early life 
Ifex G Was born and raised in Onitsha, Anambra state into a very conservative family. He did most of his growing up in fegge and omagba, both in Onitsha.

Music career 

Ifex G started music professionally after emerging winner of the maiden edition of Okija Rising - a talent show hosted by the Obijakson Foundation in Okija - in December 2016.

He then signed first record deal with Spice Records in 2017 - releasing records like "Jehovah" and "Shake Body"

In 2019, he signed for E-L-K Records after leaving Spice Records on mutual agreement.

At E-L-K Records he collaborated with Zoro on a song Junky before releasing an EP - Anumanu in 2020.

In 2022 he collaborated with Phyno for the remix of Ọfọ which shut him into prominence.

Discography

Singles 
 Jehovah (2017)
 Shake Body (2017)
 Junky (2020)
 Mmehie (2021)
 Ọfọ (2022)

Albums/EPs 
 Anumanu (2020)

Awards/Competitions 
 Okija Rising (Winner) (2016)

References 

Nigerian male rappers
Igbo rappers
Musicians from Anambra State
Lists of Nigerian musicians
1997 births
Living people